From the Balcony is a 2017 Norwegian drama film directed by Ole Giæver. It was screened in the Panorama section at the 67th Berlin International Film Festival.

Cast
 Ole Giæver

References

External links
 

2017 films
2017 drama films
Norwegian drama films
2010s Norwegian-language films